Juanita Martínez (10 May 1925 – 12 May 2001) was an Argentine vedette, who starred in revue shows. She also worked as a film, television and theater actress. She was the wife of actor Jose "Pepe" Marrone and often performed with him.

Biography
Juanita Martínez was born on 10 May 1925 in the San Isidro neighborhood of Buenos Aires, Argentina. She was offered her first job, as a dancer, in 1938, having to obtain a special permit because she was minor. She worked for three years in various dance companies and then decided to join a burlesque show, despite her family's objections.

She played in many review shows in costumes made of elaborate feathers and provocative dresses and became a star of revue. She was known for her mischievous humor, irony and sometimes spontaneous irreverent retorts.

In 1950, she met the comic José Marrone and they began working together in a production of El cabo Scamione at the Teatro Astral. The two became a couple, both in their private lives and careers, but could not marry as Marrone was married and his wife was ill. When she died, the couple were married in 1972 and were together until Marrone's death in 1990.

Martínez had been suffering from cancer and committed suicide on 12 May 2001 in her apartment in Buenos Aires.

Filmography

Films
 Cristóbal Colón en la Facultad de Medicina (1962)
 El mago de las finanzas (1962)

Television
 Los trabajos de Marrone (1960/1963) 
 Viernes de Pacheco (1968/1973) 
 El circo de Marrone (1970/1971) 
 El Circo del 9 (1971) 
 El boliche de Marrone (1972) 
 Corrientes y Marrone... la esquina de la revista (1973)
 Cebollitas (1997/1998)

References

1925 births
Argentine vedettes
Argentine stage actresses
Actresses from Buenos Aires
20th-century Argentine women singers
2001 suicides
Suicides by firearm in Argentina